Nina Kajzba (born 4 April 2004) is a Slovenian footballer who plays as a forward for Italian club Roma and the Slovenia women's national team. She previously played for ŽNK Pomurje before her move to Italy.

Club career
Kajzba played for Pomurje in Slovenia during the 2020–21 UEFA Women's Champions League.

International career
Kajzba made her senior debut for Slovenia on 13 April 2021 during a 5–0 friendly home win over Slovakia.

References

External links
Nina Kajzba at NZS 

2004 births
Living people
Slovenian women's footballers
Women's association football forwards
Slovenia women's international footballers
ŽNK Mura players
A.S. Roma (women) players
Serie A (women's football) players
Slovenian expatriate footballers
Slovenian expatriate sportspeople in Italy
Expatriate women's footballers in Italy